The Hitachi WPGA Championship was a women's professional golf tournament on the Ladies European Tour. It was played 1979 and 1980 in England.

The 1981 tournament was cancelled after sponsors withdrew their support.

Winners

References

External links
Ladies European Tour

Former Ladies European Tour events
Golf tournaments in England
Defunct sports competitions in England
Recurring sporting events established in 1979
Recurring sporting events disestablished in 1980